Aliabad (also Romanized as ‘Alīābād) is a village in Dadin Rural District, Jereh and Baladeh District, Kazerun County, Fars Province, Iran. At the 2006 census, its population was 91, in 29 families.

References 

Populated places in Kazerun County